Aadhyamayi is a 1991 Indian Malayalam film, directed by Joseph Vattoli.  The film has musical score by S. P. Venkatesh.

Soundtrack
The music was composed by S. P. Venkatesh and the lyrics were written by Varkala Sreekumar.

References

External links
 

1991 films
1990s Malayalam-language films